The following is a list of schools in Eastern Province, Sri Lanka.

Ampara District

National schools

Provincial schools

Private schools

International schools

Batticaloa District

National schools

Provincial schools

Kattankudy
batticaloa central 
BT/BC Al-hira maha vidyalayam , Kattankudy
1AB
1800

Private schools

International schools

Special Schools

Trincomalee District

National schools

Provincial schools

International schools

References

 
Eastern Province